Yablochny is a rural locality (a khutor) in Avilovskoye Rural Settlement, Ilovlinsky District, Volgograd Oblast, Russia. The population was 5 as of 2010.

Geography 
Yablochny is located in steppe, on the Volga Upland, 10 km southwest of Ilovlya (the district's administrative centre) by road. Ilovlya is the nearest rural locality.

References 

Rural localities in Ilovlinsky District